The 2011 West Coast Conference men's basketball tournament was held March 4–7 at the Orleans Arena in the Las Vegas-area community of Paradise, Nevada to crown a champion of the West Coast Conference. In the third consecutive final that involved Gonzaga and Saint Mary's, Gonzaga won to secure its 13th consecutive appearance in the NCAA tournament.

Format
All eight teams in the conference qualified for the tournament, with seeds based on regular season records. The top two seeds received byes into the semifinals while the 3 and 4 seeds received byes into the quarterfinals. The first and second round games were broadcast by BYUtv Sports. The two semifinal games were televised on ESPN2, with the championship game broadcast by ESPN.

Bracket
All Times Pacific

References

Tournament
West Coast Athletic Conference men's basketball tournament
West Coast Athletic Conference men's basketball tournament
West Coast Conference men's basketball tournament
Basketball competitions in the Las Vegas Valley
College basketball tournaments in Nevada
College sports tournaments in Nevada